Canajoharie was a major town in the Mohawk nation.

Canajoharie may also refer to:

 Canajoharie (town), New York
 Canajoharie (village), New York
 Canajoharie Creek
 Canajoharie Falls
 Canajoharie Central School District
 Canajoharie and Catskill Railroad
 Canajoharie Reservoir (Fulton County, New York)
 Canajoharie Reservoir (Montgomery County, New York)
 "Canajoharie", a song by They Might Be Giants from Join Us